Estonian Gymnastics Federation (abbreviation EGF) is one of the sport governing bodies in Estonia which deals with gymnastics.

EGF was established on 14 March 1934 as Estonian Gymnasts' Federation. During Soviet Estonia period, there existed Estonian SSR Rhythmic Gymnastics Federation and Estonian SSR Sport Gymnastics Federation. EGF is re-established on 10 December 1989.

EGF is a member of International Gymnastics Federation (FIG) and Estonian Olympic Committee.

References

External links
 

Sports governing bodies in Estonia
Gymnastics in Estonia
National members of the European Gymnastics
Sports organizations established in 1934